Touch is the fifth studio album by American pop singer Laura Branigan, released on July 7, 1987, by Atlantic Records. The album saw Branigan's return to dancefloors with the lead single, the Stock Aitken Waterman-produced "Shattered Glass", which was released in June 1987 and reached number 48 on the Billboard Hot 100. The album's second single, a cover of Jennifer Rush's "Power of Love", was released in October 1987, peaking at number 26 on the Billboard Hot 100. "Spirit of Love" was released as a single in Europe, while "Cry Wolf" served as the album's third single in the United States.

Track listing
All tracks produced by David Kershenbaum, except "Shattered Glass" and "Whatever I Do", produced by Stock Aitken Waterman; additional production on "Name Game" by Albert Cabrera and Tony Moran.

Personnel
Credits adapted from the liner notes of Touch.

Musicians

 Laura Branigan – lead vocals ; background vocals 
 Bob Marlette – arrangements, drum programming, guitars, keyboards ; string arrangements ; additional keyboards 
 Sue Shifrin – background vocals 
 Andrew Thomas – PPG programming 
 Rick Palombi – arrangements, keyboards, drum programming, background vocals 
 Mark Leggett – keyboards ; arrangements, drum programming, guitars 
 Michael Landau – guitars 
 Dennis Henson – background vocals 
 Donna de Lory – background vocals 
 Mona Young – background vocals 
 Kim Scharnberg – string arrangements, conducting 
 Kenneth G. Kugler – copyist 
 Julie Ann Gigante, Ralph D. Morrison III, Clayton Haslop, Alexander Horvath, R.F. Peterson, Arthur Zadinsky, Michael Nowak, Raymond J. Tischer II, Margot MacLaine, Armen Ksjikian, Dennis Karmazyn, Michael Matthews – strings 
 John O'Hara – keyboards 
 Mike Stock – keyboards, Linn programming, background vocals 
 Matt Aitken – keyboards, Linn programming, guitars 
 A. Linn – drums 
 Dee Lewis – background vocals 
 Coral Gordon – background vocals 
 Jeff Lorber – arrangements, keyboards, drum programming 
 Students from St. Finbar School – background vocals 
 Carlos Vega – drums 
 John Nelson – guitars 
 David J. Holman – PPG programming

Technical

 David Kershenbaum – production 
 Stock Aitken Waterman – production 
 Albert Cabrera – additional production, mix 
 Tony Moran – additional production, mix 
 John Guess – engineering 
 David J. Holman – additional engineering ; mixing ; engineering 
 Cliff Jones – additional engineering 
 Troy Krueger – additional engineering ; engineering ; second engineer
 Mark McGuire – engineering 
 Peter Hammond – mixing 
 Ray Leonard – second engineer
 Bob Ludwig – mastering

Artwork
 Janis Wilkins – art direction, design
 Victoria Pearson – photography

Charts

Notes

References

External links
 

1987 albums
Albums produced by David Kershenbaum
Albums produced by Stock Aitken Waterman
Atlantic Records albums
Laura Branigan albums